Zheng Jing, Prince of Yanping (25 October 1642 – 17 March 1681), courtesy names Xianzhi and Yuanzhi, pseudonym Shitian, was a 17th-century Chinese warlord, Ming dynasty loyalist and ruler of the Kingdom of Tungning in Taiwan.

Biography 
Born on 25 October 1642, he was the eldest son of Koxinga (Zheng Chenggong) and a grandson of the pirate-merchant Zheng Zhilong. After the conquest of Fort Zeelandia in 1662 by his father, Zheng Jing controlled the military forces in Amoy and Quemoy on his father's behalf. Upon the death of his father six months later, Zheng Jing contested throne as the King of Tungning with his uncle, Zheng Shixi. The dispute was resolved in Zheng Jing's favor after he successfully landed an army in Taiwan despite strong opposition by the forces of his uncle. This was followed by Zheng Shixi withdrawing his claim.

With both the vast pirate fleet and the throne of Tungning, he intended to continue his father's plans to invade the Philippines; however, he was forced to abandon this venture when faced with the threat of a Manchu-Dutch alliance. His defeat of a combined Qing-Dutch fleet commanded by Han Banner General Ma Degong in 1664 resulted in ending the brief alliance. Ma Degong was killed in the battle by Zheng's fleet. 

The Dutch looted relics and killed monks after attacking a Buddhist complex at Putuoshan on the Zhoushan islands in 1665 during their war against Zheng Chenggong's son Zheng Jing.

Zheng Jing's navy executed thirty four Dutch sailors and drowned eight Dutch sailors after looting, ambushing and sinking the Dutch fluyt ship Cuylenburg in 1672 on northeastern Taiwan. Only twenty one Dutch sailors escaped to Japan. The ship was going from Nagasaki to Batavia on a trade mission.

For the next 19 years, he tried to provide sufficiently for the local inhabitants and reorganizing their military forces in Taiwan. He frequently exchanged ambassadors with the Kangxi Emperor from the mainland. Although he continued to fight for the cause his father died for, he had largely abandoned any pretense of restoring the Ming dynasty by the time he invaded Fujian in 1676. Zheng's forces land in Siming at the behest of Geng Jingzhong, who has joined the Revolt of the Three Feudatories, following the lead of Wu Sangui. He occupied key cities in the province for a year before losing them back to the Manchus by the end of 1677. Invading Fujian once more, he led a force of 30,000 men to capture Haicheng as well as taking the provincial commander prisoner.

In 1680, Zheng Jing was forced to abandon Amoy, Quemoy and Tang-soaⁿ after losing a major naval battle to Chinese Qing admiral Shi Lang. Driven off the mainland by the Manchus, he retreated to modern-day Tainan where he died on 17 March 1681. Zheng named as his successor his oldest son, Zheng Kezang; however, Zheng Kezang was quickly toppled in favor of Zheng Keshuang.

Family 
Parents
 Father:  Zheng Chenggong, Prince of Yanping
 Mother: Dong You, Queen of Tungning
Consorts and issues
 Princess Wen of Chao, of the Tang clan (潮文王妃唐氏)
 Lady Chen, of the Chen clan (陳氏;1626－1662), personal name Zhaoniang (昭娘)
 Zheng Kezang (鄭克𡒉;1662–1681), Crown Prince of Yanping (延平王世子), first son
 Lady Lin, of the Lin clan (林氏)
 Lady Li, of the Li clan (李氏)
 Lady Lai, of the Lai clan (賴氏)
 Lady Huang, of the Huang clan (黃氏), personal name Heniang (和娘)
 Zheng Keshuang, Prince of Yanping (鄭克塽; 13 August 1670 – 22 September 1707), second son
 Unknown:
 Zhang Kebo (鄭克壆), third son
 5 sons and 6 daughters

See also 
 Kingdom of Tungning
 History of Taiwan
 Zheng Chenggong
 Shi Lang

References

Bibliography 
 Carioti, Patrizia. “The Zhengs' Maritime Power in the International Context of the 17th Century Far East Seas: The Rise of a 'Centralised Piratical Organisation' and Its Gradual Development into an Informal 'State'”. Ming Qing Yanjiu (1996): 29–67.
 Chang Hsiu-jung, Anthony Farrington, Huang Fu-san, Ts'ao Yung-ho, Wu Mi-tsa, Cheng Hsi-fu, and Ang Ka-in. The English Factory in Taiwan, 1670–1685. Taipei: National Taiwan University, 1995.
 Clements, Jonathan. Coxinga and the Fall of the Ming Dynasty. Stroud: Sutton Publishing, 2004. 
 
 Keene, Donald Keene. The Battles of Coxinga: Chikamatsu’s Puppet Play, Its Background and Importance. London: Taylor's Foreign Press, 1950.
 Manthorpe, Jonathan. Forbidden Nation: a History of Taiwan, New York: Palgrave MacMillan, 2002. 
 Shen Yu. Cheng-shih shih-mo. 1836.
 Wills, Jr., John E. Pepper, Guns and Parleys: The Dutch East India Company and China 1622–1681. Cambridge: Harvard University Press, 1974. 
 

House of Koxinga
Ming dynasty generals
Kingdom of Tungning
17th-century monarchs in Asia
Taiwanese people of Tungning
Taiwanese politicians of Japanese descent
Zheng Jing
Zheng Jing
Chinese pirates
Chinese politicians of Japanese descent
Taiwanese politicians
1660s in Taiwan
1670s in Taiwan
1680s in Taiwan
Generals from Fujian
Politicians from Fujian